West Lindsey District Council in Lincolnshire, England is elected every four years. Prior to 2011 one third of the council was each year, except in every fourth year when there was an election to Lincolnshire County Council instead.

The district is divided into 20 wards, electing 36 councillors. The last ward boundary changes came into effect in 2015.

Political control
The first election to the council was held in 1973, initially operating as a shadow authority before coming into its powers on 1 April 1974. Political control of the council since 1973 has been held by the following parties:

Leadership
The leaders of the council since 2010 have been:

Council elections
1973 West Lindsey District Council election
1976 West Lindsey District Council election
1979 West Lindsey District Council election (New ward boundaries)
1980 West Lindsey District Council election
1982 West Lindsey District Council election
1983 West Lindsey District Council election
1984 West Lindsey District Council election (District boundary changes took place but the number of seats remained the same)
1986 West Lindsey District Council election
1987 West Lindsey District Council election
1988 West Lindsey District Council election
1990 West Lindsey District Council election (District boundary changes took place but the number of seats remained the same)
1991 West Lindsey District Council election
1992 West Lindsey District Council election
1994 West Lindsey District Council election
1995 West Lindsey District Council election
1996 West Lindsey District Council election
1998 West Lindsey District Council election
1999 West Lindsey District Council election (New ward boundaries)
2000 West Lindsey District Council election
2002 West Lindsey District Council election
2003 West Lindsey District Council election
2004 West Lindsey District Council election
2006 West Lindsey District Council election
2007 West Lindsey District Council election
2008 West Lindsey District Council election (Some new ward boundaries)
2010 West Lindsey District Council election
2011 West Lindsey District Council election
2015 West Lindsey District Council election (New ward boundaries)
2019 West Lindsey District Council election

By-election results

References

 By-election results

External links
West Lindsey District Council

 
Council elections in Lincolnshire
District council elections in England